Hugo López (born 1 February 1973) is a Guatemalan racewalker. He competed in the men's 50 kilometres walk at the 1996 Summer Olympics.

References

1973 births
Living people
Athletes (track and field) at the 1996 Summer Olympics
Guatemalan male racewalkers
Olympic athletes of Guatemala
Place of birth missing (living people)
Central American Games silver medalists for Guatemala
Central American Games medalists in athletics
Athletes (track and field) at the 1995 Pan American Games
Pan American Games competitors for Guatemala
Central American and Caribbean Games medalists in athletics